Victorian Railways box and louvre vans may refer to:

 Victorian Railways box vans
 Victorian Railways iced vans
 Victorian Railways louvre vans